The 1828 Maine gubernatorial election took place on September 8, 1828. Incumbent Democratic-Republican Governor Enoch Lincoln won re-election to a third term.

Results

References

Gubernatorial
1828
Maine
September 1828 events